Vladas Jankauskas (10 May 1903 – March 1969) was a Lithuanian cyclist. He competed in the individual road race at the 1928 Summer Olympics.

References

External links
 

1903 births
1969 deaths
Lithuanian male cyclists
Olympic cyclists of Lithuania
Cyclists at the 1928 Summer Olympics
Place of birth missing